The Davisville Naval Construction Battalion Center was a United States Navy Seabee base located in Davisville, Rhode Island. It operated from 1942 until 1994, when after it was recommended for closure during the 1991 Base Realignment and Closure Commission. It was made up of Camp Thomas, Camp Endicott, the Advanced Base Depot, and the Advanced Base Proving Ground, and was located next to Naval Air Station Quonset Point for most of its existence.

External links
Flickr.com: Images of Davisville Naval Construction Battalion Center
Quonsetpoint.artinruins.com: BASE − Advancing a Post-Military Landscape — extensive 2000 photographic survey of Davisville & adjacent Quonset Point Naval Bases, by Erik Carlson + Erica Carpenter.

United States Navy installations
Buildings and structures in North Kingstown, Rhode Island
Buildings and structures in Washington County, Rhode Island
Military installations in Rhode Island
Narragansett Bay
Government buildings completed in 1942
Military installations established in 1942
1942 establishments in Rhode Island
1994 disestablishments in Rhode Island
Military installations closed in 1994
Historic American Buildings Survey in Rhode Island
Military Superfund sites
Superfund sites in Rhode Island